The Attorney General of Utah is an elected constitutional officer in the executive branch of the state government of Utah. The attorney general is the chief legal officer and legal adviser in the state. The office is elected, with a term of four years.

Attorney general of Deseret
Daniel H. Wells (1849)

Utah Territory attorneys general (1850–1874)

 Hosea Stout (1850–?)
 James Ferguson
 Albert Carrington (1856–?)
 Zerubbabel Snow (1869–1874)

List of attorneys general

References

External links
 Utah Attorney General official website
 Utah Attorney General articles at ABA Journal
 News and Commentary at FindLaw
 Utah Code at Law.Justia.com
 U.S. Supreme Court Opinions - "Cases with title containing: State of Utah" at FindLaw
 Utah State Bar
 Utah Attorney General Sean Reyes profile at National Association of Attorneys General
 Press releases at Utah Attorney General